In organic chemistry, AD-mix  is a commercially available mixture of reagents that acts as an asymmetric catalyst for various chemical reactions, including the Sharpless asymmetric dihydroxylation of alkenes. The two letters AD, stand for asymmetric dihydroxylation.   The mix is available in two variations, "AD-mix α" and "AD-mix β" following ingredient lists published by Barry Sharpless.

The mixes contain:
 Potassium osmate K2OsO2(OH)4 as the source of Osmium tetroxide 
 Potassium ferricyanide K3Fe(CN)6, which is the re-oxidant in the catalytic cycle
 Potassium carbonate
 A chiral ligand:
AD-mix α contains (DHQ)2PHAL, the phthalazine adduct with dihydroquinine

AD-mix β contains (DHQD)2PHAL, the phthalazine adduct with dihydroquinidine

References

External links
 Catalytic Asymmetric Dihydroxylation of Alkenes at Imperial College London Link

Reagents for organic chemistry